Ronnie Alan Fernández Sáez (born 30 January 1991) is a Chilean professional footballer who plays for Bolívar as a forward.

Career
On 9 July 2017, Fernández signed a three-year contract with Saudi Arabian club Al-Fayha for a fee of €1.75 million. He made his debut on 10 August 2017 against Al-Hilal and scored the opening goal with a penalty kick, but in the end his team lost 2–1.

Fernández was the top scorer of the Saudi Professional League of the 2017–18 season, scoring 13 goals in 25 matches. 

On 26 March 2019, Fernández scored the opening goal against Arsenal in a 3–2 defeat at the recently renovated Al Maktoum Stadium.

Fernández scored a hat-trick against Al-Ittihad on 19 December 2019 in a 4–1 win.

References

External links
 
 
 Ronnie Fernandez at Goal.com

1991 births
Living people
People from Punta Arenas
People from Magallanes Province
People from Magallanes Region
Association football forwards
Chilean footballers
Santiago Wanderers footballers
Puerto Montt footballers
Naval de Talcahuano footballers
Deportes Concepción (Chile) footballers
Deportivo Cali footballers
Club Bolívar players
Al-Fayha FC players
Al-Nasr SC (Dubai) players
Al-Raed FC players
Universidad de Chile footballers
Chilean Primera División players
Primera B de Chile players
Categoría Primera A players
Bolivian Primera División players
Saudi Professional League players
UAE Pro League players
Chilean expatriate footballers
Expatriate footballers in Colombia
Expatriate footballers in Bolivia
Expatriate footballers in Saudi Arabia
Expatriate footballers in the United Arab Emirates
Chilean expatriate sportspeople in Bolivia
Chilean expatriates in Bolivia
Chilean expatriate sportspeople in Colombia
Chilean expatriates in Colombia
Chilean expatriate sportspeople in Saudi Arabia
Chilean expatriates in Saudi Arabia
Chilean expatriate sportspeople in the United Arab Emirates